The Parole Board of Canada (formerly known as the National Parole Board) is the Canadian government agency that is responsible for reviewing and issuing parole and criminal pardons in Canada. It operates under the auspices of Public Safety Canada.

History 
The old Ticket of Leave Act was replaced by the Parole Act of 1959, which enshrined the principle of rehabilitation. As conceived by the Parole Act, the Parole Board of Canada was a completely independent parole decision-making authority. The legislators envisioned a very powerful organization, with considerable discretionary authority and a much broader mandate than the old Remission Service had. To ensure their immunity from political interference or influence, the five Board members were appointed for 10-year terms, with the possibility of renewal.
The legislation set out the new criteria for parole: the Board could release an inmate who "derived the maximum benefit from imprisonment," when "the reform and rehabilitation of the inmate will be aided by parole," and when "release would not be an undue risk to society."
Discretion, of course, is a double-edged sword. The Board had the freedom to deal with each case on its own merits. It also, unfortunately, had the freedom to make mistakes. Board member Frank Miller, for one, saw the potential for disaster: "I tried and tried to get them to have a policy," but the members were confident they could rely on their own judgement. The Corrections and Conditional Release Act, Criminal Records Act and the Criminal Code specify the authorities for the PBC. In 2003, it was reported that the whereabouts of over 800 federal offenders and over 1100 provincial offenders on parole and escapees in Canada are unknown.

Authority 
An independent administrative tribunal, the Board has the exclusive authority under the Corrections and Conditional Release Act to grant, deny, cancel, terminate or revoke day parole and full parole. In addition, the Board is responsible for making decisions to grant, deny and revoke pardons under the Criminal Records Act and the Criminal Code.

The head of the PBC is a Chairperson who reports to Parliament through the Minister of Public Safety. As an independent agency, the Minister does not direct the operations of the PBC. The annual budget of the PBC is $43 million and the headquarters are located in Ottawa, Ontario with regional offices in Moncton, New Brunswick, Montreal, Quebec, Kingston, Ontario, Saskatoon, Saskatchewan, Abbotsford, British Columbia and Edmonton, Alberta.

Under the Corrections and Conditional Release Act, which governs federal corrections, provinces and territories may establish their own parole boards for offenders sentenced to a term of incarceration of less than two years. Only three provinces now have their own parole boards: Ontario, Alberta and Quebec.

Parole is an option available to most offenders. The offender will have to spend a prescribed amount of time in custody, depending on the offence. For the vast majority of offences, that period is one third of the total sentence imposed.

Parole is not automatic. The parole board must consider, first and foremost, the protection of the public. Secondary considerations are reintegration, rehabilitation and compassion. When life sentences are imposed, eligibility for parole is 25 years in first-degree murder cases, between 10 and 25 years in second-degree murder cases, and 7 years for other life sentences or indeterminate sentences. Any person released on parole from a life sentence or an indeterminate sentence must remain on parole and be subject to parole conditions of the board for the remainder of the offender's life.

Individuals convicted of multiple murder may be given consecutive parole ineligibility periods thus extending their parole ineligibility period beyond 25 years. In rare cases this ineligibility for parole may extend beyond a normal life span, meaning, in de facto terms, a sentence of life-without-parole.

For a reflection on the work of a Member of the Parole Board see Lubomyr Luciuk's article in The Toronto Star, "Making parole decisions is one tough job," 23 June 2016.

Record Suspensions 
Under the Criminal Records Act, Section 2.1, the Parole Board of Canada is the administrative tribunal that has the exclusive authority to make decisions regarding Record Suspensions. A Record Suspension is a formal means to remove the disadvantages associated with having a Criminal Record for people that have been convicted of a criminal offence. In order to apply for a Record Suspension an individual must complete an application that is later reviewed by the Board and a decision to grant, or deny the application is made by an officer. Under Section 7, the Parole Board of Canada also has the ability to revoke granted Record Suspensions if there is a breach in good conduct on the part of the applicant or if a person reoffends and commits an indictable offence and even in some cases a summary offence.

Changes to the Pardon Process
The process of a pardon underwent significant changes in the application in June 2010 as a result of amendments to the Criminal Records Act, through Bill C-23B. Specifically, new waiting periods of 10 years were made for personal injury offences and indictable sexual offences. All other offences fell under a waiting period of 5 years for indicatable offences and 3 years for summary convictions. Additional information was now required for indictable applications, which would detail why they are applying for a pardon, what benefit it would provide and how it would assist their rehabilitation. Applicants would also need to explain changes in their lives since their conviction(s) and give details about what, how and why the offence occurred. The fee was raised at this time from $50 to $150.

In 2012 Bill C-10  was passed which brought further changes to the Criminal Records Act. The term “pardon” was replaced by “record suspension.” The reasoning behind this is said to be that “pardon” connotes forgiveness, which the government does not want to appear to have given. The waiting period for convictions increased further to five years for summary convictions, and 10 years for indictable convictions, or those whose method of trial cannot be confirmed. The final big change was the creation of Schedule 1 offences, which is essentially a list of primarily sexual offences against minors. Any person convicted of one of these offences is no longer eligible to apply for a pardon or record suspension, unless they meet some very stringent exceptions. The fee at this time increased substantially in an effort to create a cost recovery model, raising to the current amount of $631.

Criticism and controversy

The Parole Board of Canada has been criticized for its judgment in the handling of certain cases. Notable examples include:

Conrad Brossard was given a life sentence in 1970 after being convicted of murder. He also had a criminal history dating back decades, including multiple convictions for assault, attempted rape and armed robbery. In February 2002, the parole board granted Brossard day parole again. Shortly after his release, Brossard raped Cecile Clement, before stabbing her to death. An internal review of the Brossard case prepared by the Parole Board of Canada and the Correctional Service of Canada stated that "the board does not have any criticism to make with respect to the general management of Brossard's correctional plan" and that there was no "irregularity or weakness in the decision-making process." Pierre Etoile, Clement's son-in-law, criticized the parole board, stating that "They tell us in this report that everything is wonderful, no one did anything wrong. Except my family is still grieving." Thérèse Clément, the victim's sister stated that "The guilty party here is the judicial system. It's inconceivable that this happened because people didn't evaluate how dangerous this person was."

Larry Takahashi received three concurrent life sentences in 1984 for sexually assaulting seven women (he was subsequently dubbed the Balaclava Rapist). In 1997, he admitted to attacking over 30 women and was suspected by police in 120 attacks. In 2003, Takahashi was granted parole despite his own admission that he was at risk to re-offend. Randy White, an MP from the Canadian Alliance party, criticized the board for releasing Takahashi, stating that "Is there something I don’t understand about protection of the public?" It was reported that Takahashi's victims will not be told where he will live during his parole because of federal privacy laws. In 2005, it was reported that Takahashi had repeatedly violated his parole by drinking, lying to his parole officer, and socializing with other sex offenders. His parole was subsequently revoked in 2013. In 2016, the board denied Correctional Service's request for full parole, instead granting day parole with a number of conditions.

Eric Norman Fish was released to a halfway house in 2004 in Vernon, British Columbia. Fish had been serving a life sentence for a 1984 murder. In 2004, Fish was charged with the murder of Jeffrey Drake, whose body was found on the shore of Okanagan Lake. In 2007, Fish was again charged with the murder of Bill Abramenko, a 75-year-old retired carpenter. The Royal Canadian Mounted Police admitted that during the six weeks Fish was at large, no alert was issued by police or the parole board. Fish's arrest ignited a national debate on the role of the Parole Board of Canada. The case lead to widespread changes for the police and the parole board.

In 1995, Robert Bruce Moyes was granted day parole. He was serving a 1987 life sentence for multiple armed robberies and had a total of 36 criminal convictions, including three attempted murders and three escapes from prison. Moyes also had numerous previous parole violations. Later in 1995, Moyes and an accomplice was charged with the murder of seven people. Moyes later plead guilty to the murders. A subsequent investigation by the Parole Board concluded that there was a "sound basis" for his conditional release from prison and that "It is unnecessary to offer any specific direction on change or amendment to policies, practices or procedures." Although the investigation was completed in 2003, it was not released to the public until 2006 (and its release was not announced) and only in a heavily redacted format. In support of the decision to release Moyes, the report repeatedly cited his involvement with native spirituality, despite the fact that Moyes is not a native Canadian. 
When testifying in court, Moyes "happily admitted that he lied repeatedly to parole and corrections officials for the past 30 years." John Vandoremalen, a spokesman for the Parole board, stated in an interview regarding the investigation that "People can lie. It would not be the first time the board has been deceived." The investigation did not (and was not asked to) determine how Moyes repeatedly managed to fool the Parole board into releasing him. Moyes will be eligible for parole again in 2027 when he is 72.

Allan Craig MacDonald was paroled in late-1989 after serving 12 years for murdering a police officer and a taxi driver. In April 1990, MacDonald beat, raped, stabbed, and murdered 21-year-old Linda Shaw and set her body on fire. (Although MacDonald was not convicted for this crime (he committed suicide in 1994), his guilt was confirmed by a DNA test in 2005).

Michael Hector received full parole after serving half of a 13-year sentence. He had an extensive criminal history, had previously violated parole and had been described in psychological assessments as "a highly criminalized man." In early 1997, approximately 18 months after his release, Hector murdered three people, including a young boy.

Kevin Humphrey was granted parole although he had been sentenced to life for robbing and murdering a man in 1983 before fleeing the country. Despite three previous parole violations, Humphrey was paroled again in 2006. In October of that year, Humphrey stabbed Richard Kent multiple times with a folding knife and then slit his throat in a crack house. Although Kent survived, he still has brain injury symptoms and memory problems.

Denis Lortie was granted full parole in 1996 after serving 12 years in prison for murdering three people and injuring 13 others. The decision went against the wishes of the victims relatives, although as of 2010, Lortie has not reoffended.

Léopold Dion was paroled in 1963. He had been sentenced to life in prison for rape and attempted murder and previously violating parole by sexually assaulting a young boy. Within 18 months of being released, Dion molested 21 children and murdered four of them. Dion was subsequently killed in prison.

Chad Bucknell was granted day parole in 2002, six years after he received a life sentence for murdering four people. Bucknell subsequently disappeared until he was recaptured in 2004. Bucknell was granted parole again in 2006 and had so far not been re-arrested.

Daniel Jonathan Courchene, a known gang member, was kept on parole even though the Board knew that Courchene was repeatedly violating his parole by using intoxicants. While on parole, Courchene and an accomplice attempted to kill a police officer by shooting him in the face, stole several vehicles, and committed a home invasion in which they attempted to kill the owner.

In early 2011 a convicted Quebec fraudster, Vincent Lacroix was released after serving 18 months of his 13-year sentence for stealing over $100 million. Sections 125 and 126 of the Corrections and Conditional Release Act allow a narrow set of non-violent offenders access to parole after serving one sixth of their sentence. As a response to extensive media coverage and public outcry, the Conservative Party of Canada, at the urging of the Bloc Québécois tabled Bill C-59, a law which end early parole for non-violent offenders.

The PBC said that between 1995 and 2000, more than 70% of 11,466 offenders released on full parole completed their sentence successfully while about 16% had their parole revoked for breach of conditions and 12.5% had their parole revoked as a result of committing a new offense.

In addition, the PBC noted that in the same five-year period, over 16,000 prisoners were released for day parole and that of these, nearly 83% were completed successfully, 12% had their parole revoked for breaches of conditions, and only 5.7% were revoked for committing new offenses.

Although Correctional Service of Canada insist incidents like those above are rare, a report by the Canadian Police Association revealed that between 1998 and 2003, 66 people have been killed by convicts out on early release.

Gladys Abramenko filed a lawsuit after she was assaulted and her husband was murdered by Eric Fish, who had been granted conditional release to a halfway house despite serving a life sentence for murder and had been diagnosed with "criminal and anti-social propensities". She reached an out-of-court settlement with several national law enforcement agencies in her civil suit, seeking unspecified financial damages from Fish, the RCMP, Corrections Canada, the Parole Board of Canada and the John Howard Society.  Details of the settlement "could not be revealed".

See also
 Correctional Service of Canada

References

External links
Parole Board of Canada website

Federal departments and agencies of Canada
Public Safety Canada
Crime in Canada
Prison and correctional agencies
1959 establishments in Canada
Parole
Penal system in Canada
Canadian tribunals